The  Max McNab Trophy was awarded annually to the  Central Hockey League (CHL) player selected as the most valuable player in the Adams Cup playoffs.

Named in honour of the former CHL president Max McNab commencing with 1976–77 CHL season.

References

Central Professional Hockey League trophies and awards